Caspase 4 is an enzyme that proteolytically cleaves other proteins at an aspartic acid residue (LEVD-), and belongs to a family of cysteine proteases called caspases. The function of caspase 4 is not fully known, but it is believed to be an inflammatory caspase, along with caspase 1, caspase 5 (and the murine homolog caspase 11), with a role in the immune system.

The anti-inflammatory drug indoprofen is an inhibitor of the activity of the caspase-4 enzyme.

See also
 The Proteolysis Map
 Caspase

References

External links
 The MEROPS online database for peptidases and their inhibitors: C14.007

EC 3.4.22
Caspases